Darkland is a 2017 Danish crime thriller film directed by Fenar Ahmad. It was shortlisted as one of the three films to be selected as the potential Danish submission for the Academy Award for Best Foreign Language Film at the 90th Academy Awards. However, You Disappear was selected as the Danish entry.

Cast
 Dar Salim as Zaid
 Stine Fischer Christensen as Stine
 Ali Sivandi as Semion
 Dulfi Al-Jabouri as Alex
 Jakob Ulrik Lohmann as Torben
 Roland Møller as Claus
 B. Branco as Branco

References

External links
 

2017 films
2017 crime films
Danish crime films
2010s Danish-language films
Scanbox Entertainment films